Louis-Paul M'Fédé (26 February 1961 – 10 June 2013) was a Cameroonian professional footballer who played as a midfielder. He spent his playing career with Cameroonian side Canon Yaoundé and Olympic Mvolyé, and Stade Rennais of France. At international level, he played at the 1984 Summer Olympics in Los Angeles and two FIFA World Cup in 1990 and 1994. He also took part at the 1988, 1990 and 1992 African Cups of Nations.

M'Fédé died of a lung infection on 10 June 2013.

Honours
Canon Yaoundé
Cameroonian championship: 1982, 1992

Cameroon
Africa Cup of Nations: 1984, 1988

References

External links
 Profile at Stade-Rennais.net

1961 births
2013 deaths
Footballers from Yaoundé
Cameroonian footballers
Association football midfielders
Cameroon international footballers
Cameroon under-20 international footballers
Ligue 1 players
Segunda División players
Canon Yaoundé players
Stade Rennais F.C. players
UE Figueres footballers
1990 FIFA World Cup players
1994 FIFA World Cup players
Olympic footballers of Cameroon
Footballers at the 1984 Summer Olympics
1986 African Cup of Nations players
1988 African Cup of Nations players
1990 African Cup of Nations players
1992 African Cup of Nations players
Africa Cup of Nations-winning players
Cameroonian expatriate footballers
Cameroonian expatriate sportspeople in France
Expatriate footballers in France
Cameroonian expatriate sportspeople in Spain
Expatriate footballers in Spain